Nagin is a 1954 Indian Hindi-language romantic drama film, directed by Nandlal Jaswantlal, and written by Rajendra Krishan, Hameed Butt and Bijon Bhattacharya. It stars Vyjayanthimala and Pradeep Kumar, and has a hit musical score by Hemant Kumar. This film was partly produced in Technicolor.

The film was a blockbuster and highest-grossing film of 1954. Moreover, it established the career of Vyjayanthimala in Hindi film industry.

Synopsis 
Two Adivasi tribes (Nagi & Ragi) are in conflict for the local economic rights. The daughter of the Nagi tribe's chief, Mala (Vyjayanthimala), vows to kill the son of the Ragi tribe's chief, Sanatan (Pradeep Kumar), as revenge. Trespassing in the enemy territory, she is mesmerized by the music of a flute (played by the musician Kalyanji Virji Shah). Coming closer, she finds out that the player is Sanatan. They fall in love, but find it difficult to appease the enmity between the two tribes and to resist the attempts of the villain Prabir (Jeevan) to marry Mala.

Cast
 Vyjayanthimala... Mala
 Pradeep Kumar... Sanatan
 Jeevan... Prabir
 Mubarak... Dhopal - The Nagi Chieftain			
 Ruby Mayer... Mala's Mother (as Sulochana)
 I. S. Johar
 Krishna Kumari (Hindi Actress)
 Hiralal

Soundtrack 
The film's soundtrack was composed by Hemant Kumar. It was released under E.P. and L.P. gramophone records by The Gramophone Company of India, now known as Saregama. The lyrics were written by Rajendra Krishan.

References

External links 
 

1954 films
1950s Hindi-language films
Films scored by Hemant Kumar
Films about snakes
Films about shapeshifting